New York's 98th State Assembly district is one of the 150 districts in the New York State Assembly. It has been represented by Republican Assemblyman Karl Brabenec since 2014.

Geography 
District 98 consists of parts of Orange County and Rockland County.  It consists of Port Jervis, and the towns of Palm Tree, Deerpark, Greenville, Minisink, Warwick, Monroe, Tuxedo, and portions of Ramapo.

Recent election results

2022

2020

2018

2016

2014

2012

References 

98
Orange County, New York
Rockland County, New York